Magic for Beginners is a collection of nine works of fantasy and light horror short fiction by American writer  Kelly Link. The stories were all previously published in other venues from 2002 to 2005.

The book won the 2006 Locus Award for best short story collection. The title story, "Magic for Beginners", won the 2006 Nebula Award and 2006 Locus Award for best novella, and the 2006 British SF Award for best short fiction. Another story in the book, "The Faery Handbag", won the 2005 Hugo Award for Best Novelette, the 2006 Nebula Award, and the 2005 Locus Award for best novelette.

Stories
 "The Faery Handbag"
 "The Hortlak"
 "The Cannon"
 "Stone Animals"
 "Catskin"
 "Some Zombie Contingency Plans"
 "The Great Divorce"
 "Magic for Beginners"
 "Lull"

References

External links
 Review of Magic for Beginners by Geneva Melzack for Strange Horizons.

2005 short story collections
Fantasy short story collections
Horror short story collections
Nebula Award for Best Novella-winning works
Small Beer Press books